Adéníyì is a name of Yoruba origin, meaning "the crown or royalty has value". Notable people with the surname include:

 Aminat Adeniyi (born 1993), Nigerian sport wrestler
 Bashir Adeniyi Musa, Nigerian diplomat
 James Adeniyi (born 1992), Nigerian footballer
 Mathieu Adeniyi (born 1987), Beninese footballer
 Olasunkanmi Adeniyi (born 1997), American football player
 Olusegun Adeniyi (born 1965), Nigerian journalist
 Peter Adeniyi, Nigerian academic
 Solomon Adeniyi Babalola (born 1929), Nigerian Baptist missionary, veteran pastor, theologian and educator

See also 
 Crispin Adeniyi-Jones (1876–1957), Nigerian medical doctor and politician

References 

Yoruba-language surnames